Netechma gibberosa is a species of moth of the family Tortricidae. It is found in Ecuador (Tungurahua Province).

The ground colour of the forewings is snow white. The markings are black. The hindwings are whitish, slightly tinged with pale brownish in the posterior half of the wing and with brownish spots.

References

External links

Moths described in 2002
Endemic fauna of Ecuador
gibberosa
Moths of South America
Taxa named by Józef Razowski